Sahasi is a 1992 Indian Kannada-language action film directed by Om Sai Prakash and produced by P. Vidyasagar. The film stars Malashri, Sunil and Jaggesh. The film's music was composed by Hamsalekha and the audio was launched on the Lahari Music banner.

Cast 

Malashri 
Sunil
Vajramuni
Jaggesh
Shivaram
M. S. Umesh
Bank Janardhan
M. S. Karanth
Bangalore Nagesh
Kavitha
Rathnakar
Malathi
Om Sai Prakash in a guest appearance

Soundtrack 
The music of the film was composed and songs written by Hamsalekha.

References 

1992 films
1990s Kannada-language films
Indian action films
Films scored by Hamsalekha
Films directed by Sai Prakash
1992 action films